Reginald James Pearman III (May 23, 1924 – June 11, 2012) was an American middle distance runner who competed in the 1952 Summer Olympics. Born to Bermudian immigrants in Manhattan, he served in the United States Army during World War II and the Korean War. Following his athletic career, he also worked for the Peace Corps and United States Office of Education. He graduated from Newtown High School and New York University.

References

1924 births
2012 deaths
Sportspeople from Manhattan
Track and field athletes from New York City
American people of Bermudian descent
American male middle-distance runners
Newtown High School alumni
Olympic track and field athletes of the United States
Athletes (track and field) at the 1952 Summer Olympics
United States Army personnel of World War II
United States Army personnel of the Korean War
NYU Violets athletes
Peace Corps volunteers
20th-century American people